Nanpura is a neighbourhood located in Sitamarhi district, Bihar state, India.

Villages in Sitamarhi district